Musah Nuhu (born 17 January 1997) is a Ghanaian professional footballer who plays as a centre back for KuPS, on loan from FC St. Gallen.

Career
Nuhu joined FC St. Gallen in the summer 2018 on loan from WAFA. He impressed in the second half of the season and in May 2019 it was confirmed, that he had been handed a three-year permanent deal with the club.

On 31 July 2022, Nuhu joined Finnish club KuPS on loan.

References

External links
Musah Nuhu at FC St. Gallen's website

1997 births
Living people
Association football defenders
Ghanaian footballers
Ghanaian expatriate footballers
New Edubiase United F.C. players
FC St. Gallen players
Kuopion Palloseura players
Ghana Premier League players
Swiss Super League players
Veikkausliiga players
Ghanaian expatriate sportspeople in Switzerland
Expatriate footballers in Switzerland
Ghanaian expatriate sportspeople in Finland
Expatriate footballers in Finland